Ioannis Farmakidis (24 December 1907 – December 1980) was a Greek wrestler. He competed in the men's freestyle featherweight at the 1932 Summer Olympics.

References

External links
 

1907 births
1980 deaths
Greek male sport wrestlers
Olympic wrestlers of Greece
Wrestlers at the 1932 Summer Olympics
Sportspeople from Alexandria